The White Township School District is a comprehensive community public school district that serves students in pre-kindergarten through eighth grade from White Township, in Warren County, New Jersey, United States.

As of the 2021–22 school year, the district, comprised of one school, had an enrollment of 256 students and 32.1 classroom teachers (on an FTE basis), for a student–teacher ratio of 8.0:1.

The district is classified by the New Jersey Department of Education as being in District Factor Group "DE", the fifth-highest of eight groupings. District Factor Groups organize districts statewide to allow comparison by common socioeconomic characteristics of the local districts. From lowest socioeconomic status to highest, the categories are A, B, CD, DE, FG, GH, I and J.

Public school students in grades nine through twelve from Harmony Township, Hope Township and White Township attend Belvidere High School as part of sending/receiving relationships with the Belvidere School District As of the 2021–22 school year, the high school had an enrollment of 357 students and 32.3 classroom teachers (on an FTE basis), for a student–teacher ratio of 11.1:1.

Schools
Schools in the district (with 2021–22 enrollment data from the National Center for Education Statistics) are:
White Township Consolidated School, with 253 students in grades PreK-8

Administration
Core members of the district's administration are:
William Thompson, Chief School Administrator 
Andrew Italiano, Business Administrator / Board Secretary

Board of education
The district's board of education is comprised of nine members who set policy and oversee the fiscal and educational operation of the district through its administration. As a Type II school district, the board's trustees are elected directly by voters to serve three-year terms of office on a staggered basis, with three seats up for election each year held (since 2012) as part of the November general election. The board appoints a superintendent to oversee the district's day-to-day operations and a business administrator to supervise the business functions of the district.

References

External links
White Township Consolidated School
 
School Data for the White Township Consolidated School, National Center for Education Statistics
Belvidere High School

White Township, New Jersey
New Jersey District Factor Group DE
School districts in Warren County, New Jersey
Public K–8 schools in New Jersey